The Kansas City Parks and Boulevards Historic District is a historic district which was listed on the National Register of Historic Places in 2016.

The listing includes a total of 40 contributing properties, including one building, 27 other structures, eight objects, and four sites.

The district includes Cliff Drive.

References

National Register of Historic Places in Kansas City, Missouri		
National Register of Historic Places in Jackson County, Missouri